Ottobeuren is a Benedictine abbey, located in Ottobeuren, near Memmingen in the Bavarian Allgäu, Germany.

For part of its history Ottobeuren Abbey was one of the 40-odd self-ruling imperial abbeys of the Holy Roman Empire and, as such, was a virtually independent state. At the time of its dissolution in 1802, the imperial abbey covered 266 square kilometers and had about 10,000 subjects.

First foundation
It was founded in 764 by Blessed Toto, and dedicated to St. Alexander, the martyr. Of its early history little is known beyond the fact that Toto, its first abbot, died about 815 and that Saint Ulrich was its abbot in 972. In the 11th century its discipline was on the decline, until Abbot Adalhalm (1082–94) introduced the Hirsau Reform. The same abbot began a restoration of the decaying buildings, which was completed along with the addition of a convent for noble ladies, by his successor, Abbot Rupert I (1102–45). Under the rule of the latter the newly founded Marienberg Abbey was recruited with monks from Ottobeuren.

Blessed Conrad of Ottobeuren was abbot from 1193 until his death in 1227, described by the Benedictines as a "lover of the brethren and of the poor".

In 1153, and again in 1217, the abbey was consumed by fire. In the 14th and 15th centuries it declined so completely that at the accession of Abbot Johann Schedler (1416–43) only six or eight monks were left, and its annual revenues did not exceed 46 silver marks. Under Abbot Leonard Wiedemann (1508–46) it again began to flourish: he erected a printing establishment and a common house of studies for the Swabian Benedictines. The latter, however, was soon closed, owing to the ravages of the Thirty Years' War.

Ottobeuren became an imperial abbey in 1299, but lost this status after the prince-bishop of Augsburg had become Vogt of the abbey. These rights were renounced after a court case at the Reichskammergericht in 1624. Within months of his election in 1710, the new abbot, Rupert Ness (Rupert II, 1710–1740), the son of a master blacksmith, succeeded in solving the centuries-old dispute over jurisdiction by paying 30,000 guldens to the prince-bishop of Augsburg for his renouncing the protection  over the abbey, thus allowing Ottobeuren to regain its full status as an independent imperial abbey, although it did not become a member of the Swabian Circle. The War of the Spanish Succession not being yet over at the time, Abbot Rupert arranged to meet Emperor Charles VI who still occupied Bavaria, as well as Prince Eugene and the Duke of Marlborough who were operating in the area. 

Abbot Rupert ushered in the most flourishing period in the history of Ottobeuren which lasted until its secularization in 1802. In the zenith of its glory, Ottobeuren fell victim to the German mediatization along with all the other imperial abbeys of the Holy Roman Empire. On 1 December 1802 Ottobeuren was secularized and its territory annexed to Bavaria. At the time, the territory of the imperial abbey covered 266 square kilometers and had about 10,000 inhabitants.

The abbey
From 1711–1725 Abbot Rupert erected the present monastery, the architectural grandeur of which has merited for it the name of "the Swabian Escorial", attesting to the economic significance of the abbey. It was famous for its book illuminations.  The abbey library features stucco ceilings by Johann Baptist Zimmermann and ceiling paintings by Elias Zobel.

In 1737 Rupert also began the building of the present church, completed by his successor, Anselm Erb, in 1766.

Basilica 
The church was named a minor basilica by Pope Pius XI in 1926.

Monks of Ottobeuren
Noteworthy among monks of Ottobeuren are:
 Nicolas Ellenbog, humanist, d. 1543
 Jacob Molitor, the learned and saintly prior, d. 1675
 Albert Krey, the hagiographer, d. 1713
 Fr. Schmier, canonist, d. 1728
 Augustine Bayrhamer, d. 1782, historian
 Maurus Feyerabend, d. 1818, historian
 Abbot Honoratus Goehl (1767–1802), a promoter of true church music, and founder of two schools
 Ulric Schiegg, the mathematician and astronomer, d. 1810.

Second foundation

In 1834 King Ludwig I of Bavaria restored it as a Benedictine priory, dependent on St. Stephen's Abbey, Augsburg. The priory had care of a large parish and an industrial school of sixty or seventy orphans whom the lay brothers instructed in various trades. It was granted the status of an independent abbey in 1918.

As of 1910, the community consisted of five fathers, sixteen lay brothers, and one lay novice, who had under their charge the parish of Ottobeuren, a district school, and the industrial school for poor boys.

Ottobeuren has been a member of the Bavarian Congregation of the Benedictine Confederation since 1893.

Music
Ottobeuren Abbey has one of the richest music programs in Bavaria, with concerts every Saturday.  Most concerts feature one or more of the abbey's famous organs. The old organ, the masterpiece of French organbuilder Karl Joseph Riepp (1710–75), is actually a double organ; it is one of the most treasured historic organs in Europe.  It was the main instrument for 200 years, until 1957 when a third organ was added by G. F. Steinmeyer & Co., renovated and augmented in 2002 by Johannes Klais, making 100 stops available on five manuals (or keyboards).

Gallery

See also
Carolingian architecture
Carolingian art
List of Carolingian monasteries

References

External links

 

Monasteries in Bavaria
Benedictine monasteries in Germany
Carolingian architecture
Christian monasteries established in the 8th century
1624 disestablishments in Europe
States and territories established in 1710
Basilica churches in Germany
Minor basilicas in Germany
Imperial abbeys disestablished in 1802–03
States and territories disestablished in 1624
8th-century establishments in Germany
Unterallgäu
Religious buildings and structures completed in 764